Sogn og Fjordane (English: "Sogn and Fjordane") was, up to 1 January 2020, a county in western Norway, when it was merged to become part of Vestland county. Bordering previous counties Møre og Romsdal, Oppland, Buskerud, and Hordaland, the county administration was in the village of Hermansverk in Leikanger municipality.  The largest town in the county was Førde.

Although Sogn og Fjordane has some industry, predominantly hydroelectricity and aluminium, it is predominantly an agricultural area. Sogn og Fjordane is also home to the Urnes Stave Church and the Nærøyfjord, which are both listed by UNESCO as World Heritage Sites.

The Western Norway University of Applied Sciences has campuses in Sogndal and Førde.

Name
The name Sogn og Fjordane was created in 1919; a literal translation is: Sogn and the fjords. The first element is the name of the region of Sogn, located in the southern part of the county. The last element is the plural definite form of fjord, which refers to the two regions in the county called Nordfjord and Sunnfjord in the northern and central parts of the county.

Prior to 1919, the name of the county was Nordre Bergenhus amt which meant "(the) northern (part of) Bergenhus amt". (The old Bergenhus amt, created in 1662, was divided into northern and southern halves in 1763.)

Coat of arms
The coat of arms of Sogn og Fjordane was granted on 23 September 1983. The arms show the geographical layout of the county: three large blue fjords protruding into the white colored land. The three fjords represent the three regions of the county: Nordfjord (surrounding Nordfjorden), Sunnfjord (with Førdefjorden), and Sogn (surrounding Sognefjorden). Nearly all villages and towns are situated along one of these fjords and the name of the county is based on the fjords.

Written standard
Sogn og Fjordane is the only county in Norway in which all municipalities have declared Nynorsk to be their official written form of the Norwegian language.

History
{{Historical populations
|footnote = Source: Statistics NorwayProjected population – Statistics Norway 
|shading = off
|1951|97714
|1961|99957 
|1971|100933 
|1981|105924
|1991|106614 
|2001|107590 
|2011|107742
}}
The county consisted of the two historic counties: Firdafylke (now the Fjordane region; Nordfjord-Sunnfjord) and Sygnafylke (now the Sogn region).  These both were formed in the Middle Ages under the Gulating government. They were merged with Hordafylke (now Hordaland) and Sunnmørafylke (now Sunnmøre) to form the Bergenhus len in the late Middle Ages. The Bergenhus len was one of four len in Norway.  It was administered from the Bergenhus Fortress in the city of Bergen.

On 19 February 1662, a royal decree changed the name to Bergenhus amt.  The Sunnmøre region was moved to Romsdalen amt in 1689.  Later, in 1763, the amt was divided in half creating: Nordre Bergenhus and Søndre Bergenhus (Northern and Southern Bergenhus).  Later, on 1 January 1919, Nordre Bergenhus amt was renamed Sogn og Fjordane fylke during a period of time when many location names in Norway were changed.  In 2017, the Norwegian government announced the merger of this county as well as Hordaland into a new county called Vestland.

Government
A county (fylke) is the chief local administrative area in Norway. The country is divided into 19 counties. A county is also an election area, with popular votes taking place every 4 years.  The Sogn og Fjordane County Municipality was the government that oversaw the county.  It was a group of 39 members who were elected to form a county council (Fylkesting). Heading the Fylkesting was the county mayor (fylkesordførar). The last county mayor for the Sogn og Fjordane County Municipality was Åshild Kjelsnes, the county mayor.  She replaced Nils R. Sandal, who was county mayor from 2003 until 2011.

The county also had a County Governor (fylkesmann) who was the representative of the King and Government of Norway. Anne Karin Hamre was the last County Governor of Sogn og Fjordane. She replaced Oddvar Flæte, who was county governor from 1994 until 2011.

The municipalities of Sogn og Fjordane were divided among three district courts (tingrett''): Sogn, Fjordane, and Nordhordland. Sogn og Fjordane was also part of the Gulating Court of Appeal district based in Bergen.
 Sogn District Court: Aurland, Balestrand, Leikanger, Luster, Lærdal, Sogndal, Vik, and Årdal
 Fjordane District Court: Askvoll, Bremanger, Eid, Fjaler, Flora, Førde, Gaular, Gloppen, Hornindal, Hyllestad, Høyanger, Jølster, Naustdal, Selje, Solund, Stryn, and Vågsøy
 Nordhordland District Court: Gulen (and the rest of the Nordhordland district of the county of Hordaland)

All of the municipalities of Sogn og Fjordane except Gulen and Solund were part of the Sogn og Fjordane police district.  Gulen and Solund were part of the Hordaland police district.

Geography 
It is mainly a rural area with a scattered population. Sogn og Fjordane includes the largest glacier in mainland Norway, Jostedalsbreen, in the Breheimen mountain range, and the deepest lake, Hornindalsvatnet. There are also many famous waterfalls located in the area. Both are located in the Jotunheim mountains. Cruise ships visit Sogn og Fjordane all summer because of the unique vistas of high mountains and deep blue fjords.

The famous Nærøyfjord is located in the south of the county. This is a UNESCO listed fjord area. There are several archipelagos, including Bulandet, Bremangerlandet and islands around Florø. The westernmost point in Norway proper is Holmebåen in Solund municipality.

Because of the steep rise in elevation and fjords cutting through the terrain, the amount of precipitation is very high. Low pressure systems come in from the west and meet the mountains (a phenomenon known as orographic lifting) and cause rain and snowfall.

Transport
Transport is made more difficult because of the fjords and the mountains. The fjords have to be crossed by ferries or rounded, often a large detour. There are four airports in the county, at Florø, Førde, Sandane and Sogndal. There is only one railway station, Flåm. The county contracts bus and boat companies for bus and boat routes in the county, under the new (2015) brand name Kringom.

Districts
The county is conventionally divided into three traditional districts. These are Sogn (in the south), Sunnfjord (in the centre), and Nordfjord (in the north). Sogn surrounds Sognefjorden from Solund on the offshore island of Sula in the North Sea to the village of Skjolden in Luster along Lustrafjorden, a branch of the Sognefjord. The middle district of Sunnfjord actually has two main fjords: Førdefjorden and Dalsfjorden. The northern district surrounds Nordfjorden.

Municipalities

In 1837, the counties were divided into local administrative units, each with their own governments. The number and borders of these municipalities have changed over time, and before the dissolution of the county, there were 26 municipalities in Sogn og Fjordane.  Originally the municipalities were the same as the old Church of Norway parishes.

 Askvoll
 Aurland
 Årdal
 Balestrand
 Bremanger
 Eid
 Fjaler
 Flora
 Førde
 Gaular
 Gloppen
 Gulen
 Hornindal
 Hyllestad
 Høyanger
 Jølster
 Leikanger
 Luster
 Lærdal
 Naustdal
 Selje
 Sogndal
 Solund
 Stryn
 Vik
 Vågsøy

Cities

 Florø
 Førde
 Måløy

Parishes

 Arnafjord
 Askrova
 Askvoll
 Aurland
 Bakka
 Balestrand (Tjugum)
 Batalden
 Berle
 Bjordal
 Borgund
 Old Borgund
 Breim
 Brekke
 Bremanger
 Bremangerpollen
 Bru (Svanø)
 Bygstad (Svanø)
 Bulandet
 Bø
 Dale i Fjaler
 Dale i Luster
 Davik
 Eid
 Eikefjord
 Ervik
 Farnes
 Feios (Rinde)
 Fet
 Fjaler (Ytre Holmedal)
 Fjærland (Mundal)
 Florø
 Flåm
 Folkestad
 Fortun
 Fresvik
 Frøya
 Førde
 Gaular
 Old Gaupne
 Gaupne
 Gimmestad
 Old Gimmestad
 Gjemmestad
 Gloppen
 Guddal
 Gulen (Evindvik)
 Hafslo
 Hauge
 Heggjabygda
 Helgheim
 Haukedalen
 Hellevik
 Hersvik
 Hestad
 Holmedal
 Holsen
 Hopperstad
 Hornindal
 Hove
 Husøy (Husø)
 Hyen
 Hyllestad
 Høyanger
 Indre Holmedal, see Gaular
 Innvik
 Joranger
 Jostedal
 Jølster
 Kaupanger
 Kinn (Kinden)
 Kirkebø, see Kyrkjebø
 Kjølsdalen
 Kvamsøy
 Kyrkjebø
 Lavik
 Leikanger
 Leikanger (Leganger) i Selje
 Ljosheim
 Loen
 Luster (Lyster)
 Lærdal
 Midtgulen
 Mjømna (Mjømen)
 Mundal (Fjæreland)
 Naustdal (Nøssedal)
 Nedstryn
 Nes
 Nordal
 Norddalsfjord
 Nord-Vågsøy
 Nordsida
 Norum
 Nærøy
 Olden
 Old Olden
 Oppstryn
 Ortnevik
 Randabygd
 Rinde
 Rugsund
 Sandane
 Sande
 Selje
 Sogndal
 Solund (Sulen)
 Solvorn
 Stavang
 Stedje
 Stongfjorden
 Stryn (Innvik)
 Stårheim
 Sulen, see Solund
 Svanøy
 Svelgen
 Sæle
 Sør-VågsøySør-Vågsøy
 Tjugum (Balestrand)
 Totland
 Tønjum
 Undredal
 Urnes
 Utvik
 Vangen
 Vangsnes
 Vassenden
 Veitastrond
 Vereid
 Vereide
 Vevring (Vefring)
 Vik
 Vik (Hopperstad, Hove)
 Viksdalen
 Vilnes
 Værlandet
 Ytre Holmedal, see Fjaler
 Ølmheim
 Øn
 Ålfoten
 Ålhus
 Årdal

Villages

 Arnafjord
 Askvoll
 Aurlandsvangen
 Austreim
 Bakka
 Balestrand
 Barekstadlandet
 Barmen
 Barmøya
 Berle
 Bjordal
 Borgund
 Brandsøy
 Brekke
 Bremanger
 Bruland
 Brulandet
 Bryggja
 Bygstad
 Byrkjelo
 Byrknes
 Dale
 Dalsøyra
 Davik
 Degnepoll
 Deknepollen
 Dingja
 Eikefjord
 Eimhjellen
 Eivindvik
 Egge
 Ervik
 Espedal
 Feios
 Fimreite
 Fjærland
 Flatraket
 Flekke
 Flo
 Flåm
 Fortun
 Fresvik
 Frønningen
 Gaupne
 Gimmestad
 Grodås
 Grov
 Guddal
 Gudvangen
 Hafslo
 Hardbakke
 Haukedalen
 Heggjabygda
 Helgheim
 Helle
 Hermansverk
 Hersvikbygda
 Hestad
 Holvik
 Holmedal
 Holsen
 Hopland
 Hovden
 Hyen
 Hyllestad
 Håvik
 Høyanger
 Indre Offerdal
 Indrevevring
 Innvik
 Instefjord
 Isane
 Jostedal
 Kalvåg
 Kandal
 Kaupanger
 Kjølsdalen
 Kjørnes
 Kolgrov
 Kvalheim
 Kvammen
 Kvamsøy
 Kyrkjebø
 Langenes
 Langhaugane
 Lavik
 Leikanger
 Leikanger
 Leirvik
 Loen
 Losnegard
 Lote
 Luster
 Lærdalsøyri
 Midtgulen
 Mjømna
 Mogrenda
 Myrdal
 Naustdal
 Nedstryn
 Nes
 Nese
 Norane
 Norddalsfjord
 Nordfjordeid
 Nornes
 Nordsida
 Nyttingnes
 Olden
 Oppstryn
 Ornes
 Ortnevik
 Randabygda
 Raudeberg
 Re
 Reed
 Refvik
 Rognaldsvåg
 Roset
 Rugsund
 Rutledal
 Rygg
 Sandane
 Sande
 Seimsdalen
 Selje
 Silda
 Skei
 Skjolden
 Skorpa
 Sogndalsfjøra
 Solvorn
 Stavang
 Steinhovden
 Stongfjorden
 Straume
 Stryn
 Stårheim
 Svanøya
 Svelgen
 Sørbøvågen
 Sørstranda
 Systrond
 Tennebø
 Totland
 Tjugum
 Tønjum
 Undredal
 Urnes
 Utvik
 Vadheim
 Vangsnes
 Vassenden
 Vedvik
 Veitastrond
 Vereide
 Vik
 Vikøyri
 Vågsvåg
 Ytre Oppedal
 Øvre Årdal
 Ålfoten
 Ålhus
 Årdalstangen

Former Municipalities

 Borgund
 Breim
 Brekke
 Bru
 Davik
 Eikefjord
 Florø
 Hafslo
 Innvik
 Jostedal
 Kinn
 Kyrkjebø
 Lavik
 Lavik og Brekke
 Nord-Vågsøy
 Sør-Vågsøy
 Vevring

Gallery

See also
 List of villages in Sogn og Fjordane
 List of churches in Sogn og Fjordane

References

External links 

 County web site 
 NRK County encyclopedia 
 Firda – Sogn og Fjordane's largest newspaper 
 forum.firda.no – Sogn og Fjordane's largest discussion group 

 
Former counties of Norway
History of Vestland
2020 disestablishments in Norway